Lurline was a steamboat that served from 1878 to 1930 on the Columbia and Willamette rivers.  Lurline was a classic example of the Columbia river type of steamboat.

Construction
Lurline was launched September 30, 1878 by Jacob Kamm, who with John C. Ainsworth had designed and built the first sternwheelers in the Northwest, Jennie Clark and Carrie Ladd, nearly a quarter of a century before.

Operations on the Columbia
Capt. James T. Gray took charge of the Lurline and handled her on the Vancouver route for the first ten years of her career. During the summer season she made one trip a week in the seaside traffic, and occasionally towed ships, competing with the Oregon Railway & Navigation Company's steamers. Competition from the Lurline was said to have cost the Oregon Railway & Navigation Company over half a million dollars. In 1889 that company leased her, and, in command of Captain Pillsbury, she was operated on the Cascade route until 1892 when Kamm again commenced regular trips to Astoria.  Among her many captains was Charles T. Kamm, son of her designer.

Hassalo excursion 1888
Lurline was used to carry some of the 3,000 excursionists who gathered to witness Hassalo run the Cascades of the Columbia on Saturday, May 26, 1888, making the run up from Portland in the company of another famous sternwheeler, the R.R. Thompson, the Lurline having also embarked an army band from Vancouver Barracks. The Sunday Oregonian's correspondent described the trip up the river on that historic day:

Later years

Lurline served for over 50 years, a very long time for a wooden steamboat.  in later years she came to be owned by the Harkins Transportation Company of Portland, Oregon.

On November 9, 1894, Lurline, under Captain James T. Gray, collided with the sternwheeler Sarah Dixon, under Captain George M. Shaver, in a thick fog near Kalama, Washington. Damage to both vessels was minor, $50 worth to Lurline and $150 to Sarah Dixon.  Even so, following a hearing on December 10, 1894, both captains, who were prominent steamboat men, were found to be at fault for violating the navigation rules, and their licenses were suspended for seven days.

Lurline was rebuilt several times, and survived being rammed and sunk at Rainier, Oregon on November 21, 1906, by the steam schooner Cascade.  Lurline never acquired the reputation of a speedy boat like the Bailey Gatzert, but she did valuable service just the same:

Out of service
Lurline was dismantled in about 1930.  Her upper works were still in good condition despite having been built some 52 years before.  The cabins and other above deck structures were transferred to a new vessel, the diesel-powered L.P. Hosford which was still in operation as late as 1966.

In 1983, a new diesel-powered sternwheeler built for tourism purposes was given the name Lurdine – a union of Lurline and Undine – as a tribute to those two past vessels.  However, Lurdine was renamed Rose less than two years later, after a change of ownership and location.

Notes

Further reading
 Faber, Jim, Steamer's Wake, Enetai Press, Seattle, WA 1985 
 Mills, Randall V., Sternwheelers up Columbia, at 67-79, 195, University of Nebraska Press (1977 reprint of 1947 edition) 
 Timmen, Fritz, Blow for the Landing - A Hundred Years of Steam Navigation on the Waters of the West, Caxton Printers, Caldwell, ID 1973

External links

1878 ships
Ships built in the United States
Steamboats of Oregon
Passenger ships of the United States
Maritime incidents in 1894
Maritime incidents in 1906
Ships sunk in collisions
Shipwrecks of the Oregon coast
Harkins Transportation Company